Hymenobacter coccineus is a Gram-negative and rod-shaped bacterium from the genus of Hymenobacter which has been isolated from a rock from the James Ross Island in the Antarctica.

References

External links
Type strain of Hymenobacter coccineus at BacDive -  the Bacterial Diversity Metadatabase

coccineus
Bacteria described in 2017